The City Circle is a network body of mainly young Muslim professionals located in England and is a registered charity (Reg. No.1088931).  On 7 November 2006, The City Circle announced that it had appointed Yahya Birt as its first Director with effect from December 2006. On 3 January 2008, it announced the appointment of Usama Hasan, whose father is Suhaib Hasan, as its new Director.

Projects

Current projects include a Saturday school, careers and mentoring and helping London's homeless.

British Muslim Identity

The City Circle contributes to British Muslim Identity through its weekly discussion groups. It has also attracted controversy through policy of not aligning itself to any particular group or ideology. , where the MCB and its critics debated. 

Following the veil controversy the City Circle organised a public meeting with Jack Straw, where Jack Straw defended his comments.

References

"Paying it forward", Guardian, September 7, 2007. Accessed September 26, 2007.

External links
Website of The City Circle
City Circle Saturday School website

Islamic organisations based in the United Kingdom